This is a timeline documenting events of Jazz in the year 1987.

Events

April
 10 – The 14th Vossajazz started in Voss, Norway (April 10 – 12).

May
 20 – The 15th Nattjazz started in Bergen, Norway (May 20 – June 3).

June
 5 – The 16th Moers Festival started in Moers, Germany (June 5 – 8).
 26 – The 8th Montreal International Jazz Festival started in Montreal, Quebec, Canada (June 26 – July 6).

July
 2 – The 21st Montreux Jazz Festival started in Montreux, Switzerland (July 2 – 19).
 10 – The 12th North Sea Jazz Festival started in The Hague, Netherlands (July 10 – 12).

August
 21 – The 4th Brecon Jazz Festival started in Brecon, Wales (April 21 – 23).

September
 15 – The 30th Monterey Jazz Festival started in Monterey, California (September 15 – 17).

Album releases

Henry Threadgill: Easily Slip Into Another World
Anthony Davis: Undine
Steve Lacy: Momentum
John Zorn: Spillane
Sun Ra Arkestra: Reflections in Blue
Sun Ra Arkestra: Hours After
Hank Roberts: Black Pastels
Marilyn Crispell: Labyrinths
Guy Klucevsek: Scenes From A Mirage
David Torn: Cloud About Mercury
Bobby Previte: Dull Bang, Gushing Sound, Human Shriek
Tim Berne: Sanctified Dreams
Borbetomagus: Fish That Sparkling Bubble
Marty Ehrlich: Pliant Plaint
Tim Berne: Fulton Street Maul
Benny Carter: Central City Sketches
Bobby Previte: Pushing The Envelope
Phil Woods: Bouquet
Danny Gottlieb: Aquamarine
Dave Holland: The Razor's Edge
Elements: Illumination
Henry Kaiser: Crazy Backwards Alphabet
Henry Kaiser: Devil In The Drain
Kenny Wheeler: Flutter By, Butterfly
Mark Helias: The Current Set
Michael Brecker: Michael Brecker
Montreux: Sign Language
Sonny Sharrock: Seize the Rainbow
Mulgrew Miller: Wingspan
Neil Swainson: 49th Parallel
Earthworks: Earthworks
Chick Corea Elektric Band: Light Years
Michael Franks: The Camera Never Lies
Eliane Elias: Cross Currents
Hugh Masekela: Tomorrow

Deaths

 January
 14 – Alton Purnell, American pianist (born 1911).
 16 – Robert De Kers, Belgian trumpeter and bandleader (born 1906).

 February
 2
 Alfred Lion, German-American record executive, Blue Note Records (born 1908).
 Spike Hughes, British upright bassist, composer, and music journalist (born 1908).

March
 1 – Freddie Green, American guitarist (born 1911).
 6 – Eddie Durham, American guitarist, trombonist, composer, and arranger (born 1906).

April
 2 – Buddy Rich, American drummer and bandleader (born 1917).
 7 – Maxine Sullivan, American singer (born 1911).

May
 4 — Wilbur Little, African-American bassist (born 1928).
 12 – Victor Feldman, English pianist and percussionist (born 1934).

July
 17 – Howard McGhee, American trumpeter (born 1918).

September
 21 – Jaco Pastorius, American bass guitarist (born 1951).

October
 15 – Pete Carpenter, American trombonist (born 1914).
 29 – Woody Herman, American clarinetist, alto and soprano saxophonist, singer, and big band leader (born 1913).

 December
 10 – Slam Stewart, American upright bassist (born 1914).
 18 – Warne Marsh, American tenor saxophonist (born 1927).

Births

 January
 28 – Eldar Djangirov, American pianist.

 February
 5 – Shai Maestro, Israeli pianist.
 6 – Kaja Draksler, Slovenian pianist and composer.
 15 – Trygve Waldemar Fiske, Norwegian upright bassist.
 27 – Cory Henry, American organist, pianist, and music producer.

 March
 13 – Harald Lassen, Norwegian saxophonist and pianist.
 19 – Thana Alexa, Croatian-American vocalist and composer.

 April
 11 – Joss Stone, English singer, songwriter and actress.
 26 – Kim-Erik Pedersen, Norwegian saxophonist.
 30 – August Rosenbaum, Danish pianist, composer, and arranger

 May
 7 – Heida Mobeck, Norwegian tubist and bass guitarist.
 10 – Typh Barrow, Belgian singer, songwriter, composer and pianist.

 July
 26 – Evelina Sašenko, Lithuanian singer of Polish-Ukrainian descent.

 September
 11 – Bjørn Marius Hegge, Norwegian upright bassist and composer, Hegge.
 18 – Luísa Sobral, Portuguese singer and songwriter.

 October
 12 – Bjørnar Kaldefoss Tveite, Norwegian upright bassist (Morning Has Occurred).
 25 – André Drage, Norwegian drummer and composer.

 November
 12 – Jamison Ross, American drummer and vocalist.
 13 – Hanna Paulsberg, Norwegian tenor saxophonist and composer.

December
 12 – Marte Eberson, Norwegian pianist, keyboardist and composer.
 25 – Julian Lage, American guitarist.

 Unknown date
 Anja Lauvdal, Norwegian pianist, keyboardist, and composer.
 Hanne Kalleberg, Norwegian singer and composer.
 Mario Tomić, Croatian guitarist, arranger, composer, and producer.
 Oscar Grönberg, Swedish-Norwegian pianist.
 Thea Hjelmeland, Norwegian singer and songwriter.

See also

 1980s in jazz
 List of years in jazz
 1987 in music

References

External links 
 History Of Jazz Timeline: 1987 at All About Jazz

Jazz
Jazz by year